The Varieties of Scientific Experience: A Personal View of the Search for God is a book collecting transcribed talks on the subject of natural theology that astronomer Carl Sagan delivered in 1985 at the University of Glasgow as part of the Gifford Lectures. The book was first published posthumously in 2006, 10 years after his death. The title is a reference to The Varieties of Religious Experience by William James.

The book was edited by Ann Druyan, who also provided an introduction section. The sixth chapter, "The God Hypothesis", was later reprinted in Christopher Hitchens' anthology The Portable Atheist.

References

2006 non-fiction books
American non-fiction books
Books critical of religion
Books published posthumously
Penguin Books books
Science books
Works by Carl Sagan